H. commutata may refer to:

 Hakea commutata, an Australian plant
 Hibbertia commutata, a plant endemic to Australia
 Hypolepis commutata, a polypod fern